The Sochi is a river in the city of Sochi in Krasnodar Krai, Russia.

Originating at Bolshaya Shura Mountain in the Greater Caucasus Mountains, it flows southwest and enters the Black Sea at Sochi, itself named for the river and site of the 2014 Winter Olympic Games. It is the third longest river in Sochi after the Mzymta and the Shakhe. Administratively, the valley of the river belongs to Khostinsky City District of the city of Sochi, except for the lowest part, which belongs to Tsentralny City District. The upper course of the Sochi lies in the Caucasus Nature Reserve, a World Heritage Site, whereas the middle course, down to Plastunka, belongs to Sochi National Park.

The Sochi River begins on the southern slopes of the  Bolshaya Shura Mountain and flows toward the west-southwest through mountainous terrain and is joined by tributaries such as the Ushkho and the Ats along the way.  About  before its end at Sochi proper, the Sochi River is joined by its main tributary, the Agva.  Just beyond is site of scenic Orekhovka Falls on the Bezumenka River as it flows into the Sochi River at Nizhnaya-Orekhovka.  The Sochi then turns southward and flows through the suburbs of Plastunka, Baranovka, and Navaginka before reaching the city centre of Sochi where it is contained by concrete embankments before it enters the Black Sea.

References

Sochi
Rivers of Krasnodar Krai
Tsentralny City District, Sochi
Khostinsky City District
Tributaries of the Black Sea